Mandakini may refer to:

 Mandakini River
 Mandakini (actress)
 Mandakini River (Bundelkhand)
 Mandakini (film), a 1999 Sri Lankan film